The Toronto Regiment was an infantry regiment of the Non-Permanent Active Militia of the Canadian Militia (now the Canadian Army). The regiment was formed in 1920 when the war raised 3rd Battalion (Toronto Regiment) of the Canadian Expeditionary Force was incorporated after the First World War into the post-war Canadian Militia. In 1936, the regiment was Amalgamated with The Royal Grenadiers to form The Royal Regiment of Toronto Grenadiers (now The Royal Regiment of Canada).

Lineage 
 Originated on 1 May 1920, in Toronto, Ontario, as The Toronto Regiment.
 Amalgamated on 15 December 1936, with The Royal Grenadiers and Redesignated as The Royal Regiment of Toronto Grenadiers (now The Royal Regiment of Canada).

Perpetuations 
 3rd Battalion (Toronto Regiment), CEF
 124th Battalion (Governor General's Body Guard), CEF
 170th Battalion (Mississauga Horse), CEF
 204th Battalion (Beavers), CEF

Alliances 

  - The King's Regiment (Liverpool) (1927-1936)

Battle Honours 

 Ypres, 1915, '17
 Gravenstafel
 St. Julien
 Festubert, 1915
 Mount Sorrel
 Somme, 1916
 Pozieres
 Flers-Courcelette
 Ancre Heights
 Arras 1917, '18
 Vimy, 1917
 Arleux
 Scarpe, 1917, 18
 Hill 70
 Passchendaele
 Amiens
 Drocourt-Quéant
 Hindenburg Line
 Canal du Nord
 Pursuit to Mons
 France and Flanders, 1915-18

References 

Infantry regiments of Canada
Military units and formations of Ontario
Military units and formations disestablished in 1936